Javelina Jundred is a 100 mile (160 km) ultramarathon held at McDowell Mountain Regional Park in Fountain Hills, Arizona. Founded in 2002, it is one of the most popular ultramarathons in the United States, with over 800 participants as of 2023.

Race course and description  
Javelina Jundred is unique among top 100 mile races in that the course consists of loops that all begin and end at race headquarters. Hundred mile runners complete a total of five loops, while the 100k is three and the 31k is one loop.

Though fall temperatures are relatively cool for the Sonoran Desert, the course is still completely without shade and daytime temperatures can reach up into the 90s. Heat is often one of the top reasons for runners to drop from the race, though at night temperatures drop rapidly.

Held in late October around Halloween weekend, the race has a unique culture with many runners wearing costumes, and unconventional awards such as best costume and best ass. Race organizers typically warn participants and crew that the race is "R rated". Despite the festive atmosphere, the race has recently attracted a competitive field of elite runners, due to the fast course and the fact that it is a qualifier for the Western States Endurance Run, with the top mens and women finishers earning a "Golden Ticket" automatic entry.

History 
Founded by Geri Kilgraff in 2002, the inaurgural year of the race had 180 runners. By 2008, the race was organized by Jamil Coury of Aravaipa Running. By 2014, the race had around 700 runners and instituted a waitlist for entrants.

Course records

References

External links 

 

Ultramarathons in the United States
Sports in Maricopa County, Arizona